Bråthen is a surname. Notable people with the surname include:

Clas Brede Bråthen (born 1968), Norwegian ski jumper
Erik Mellevold Bråthen (born 1987), Norwegian footballer
Espen Andersen Bråthen, suspect in the October 2021 "bow and arrow" attacks in Kongsberg, Norway
Gunnar Bråthen (1896–1980), Norwegian trade unionist and politician
Stein Bråthen (born 1954), Norwegian cyclist
Stephen Bråthen (born 1964), Norwegian politician
Tore Bråthen (born 1954), Norwegian jurist and academic
Trond Bråthen (1977–2012), Norwegian singer-songwriter, guitarist and bassist